Five Pianos is a composition for five pianists composed in 1972 by American composer Morton Feldman. The piece is scored for five pianos and one celesta performed by the fourth pianist; the performers are also required to hum specific notes throughout the composition. It was first performed in Berlin on July 16, 1972, as part of the Berliner Musiktage festival, with the composer as one of the humming pianists.

Background 

Initially entitled Pianos and Voices, Five Pianos was commissioned by Walter Bachauer on behalf of the Berliner Musiktage, while Feldman was in Berlin on a scholarship from the German Academic Exchange Service, and was completed on January 31, 1972, in Berlin. It premiered in Berlin on July 16, 1972, in a series of avant-garde concerts held in West Berlin from July 11 to 18 subtitled . On this occasion, the humming pianists were John Cage, Cornelius Cardew, David Tudor, Frederic Rzewski, and Feldman himself. There was a controversy in the first public performance of the piece, as a misunderstanding between Cage and Feldman caused Cage to play for twenty minutes longer than the next-slowest player. The US premiere took place a few months later, in October 1972. The piece was published that same year by Universal Edition.

Structure 

The piece is scored for five pianos, as well as one celesta to be played by the fourth pianist. Players are also required to hum specific notes throughout the composition. The 149-bar composition takes around half an hour to perform, although the non-aligned, free-duration nature of the composition can cause the total duration to vary from one performance to another.

The score consists of whole notes with the sostenuto pedal held down throughout the whole piece. According to Feldman, the duration of these whole notes needs to continue far into the decay of sound of each individual note. Each performer is sometimes also required to hum a note after the sound of the piano. This note is marked as a square note in the score and is to be played very softly and barely audibly for three to five seconds. Each pianist has an individual part and is asked to perform independently from the rest, with no attempt for synchronization. Pianists start playing two seconds away from each other at the beginning at varying tempos (chosen by the performers), non-simultaneously fading away at the end. Feldman described the process of composing Five Pianos as follows:

Five Pianos is also well known for a specific motif, a scala enigmatica repeated by every pianist at different tempos specified in each bar containing the motif:

Recordings
1991: Le Bureau des Pianistes, Stéphane Ginsburgh, Laurence Cornez,  – Sub Rosa SUB CD018-41
1994: Steffen Schleiermacher, Isabel Mundry, Nils Vigeland – Hat Hut Records hat ART CD 6143
2009: Amy Briggs, Helena Bugallo, Amy Williams, Stefan Wirth – WERGO WER 67092

Footnotes

References

External links
 , Le Bureau des Pianistes

Compositions by Morton Feldman
Compositions for piano
1972 compositions